The men's freestyle 70 kg is a competition featured at the Golden Grand Prix Ivan Yarygin 2018, and was held in Krasnoyarsk, Russia on the 26th of January.

Medalists

Results
Legend
F — Won by fall

Final

Top half
qualification: Magomedrasul Gazimagomedov of Dagestan def. Abdullahgadzhi Magomedov of Dagestan (4–1)

Section 1

Repechage

References

Men's freestyle 70 kg